Topol Show is a Czech web talk show hosted by former Czech Prime Minister Mirek Topolánek. Topolánek announced his plans for the talk show on 9 January 2019. The first episode was released on 7 February 2019.

Episodes
The first guest was former Mayor of Prague and Topolánek's former rival Pavel Bém.

References

Television talk shows
Czech television shows
2019 Czech television series debuts
Mirek Topolánek
Czech television talk shows